McNeill, Mississippi is an unincorporated community in Pearl River County, Mississippi, United States. The zip code is: 39457.

Donna Pope of McNeill was crowned Miss Mississippi in 1980, and was second runner-up at the Miss America Pageant.

References 

Unincorporated communities in Pearl River County, Mississippi
Unincorporated communities in Mississippi